Gazin may refer to:
Château Gazin, a wine appellation
Gazin, Iran (disambiguation), places in Iran
Charles L. Gazin, a zoologist